Prairie Township is one of twelve townships in Warren County, Indiana, United States.

History
Prairie Township was formed in 1864 out of a portion of Pine Township.

Geography
It is almost entirely agricultural and contains a single town, Tab. Two other small communities in the eastern part of the township, Locust Grove and Walnut Grove, dwindled away during the 20th century and are now extinct.

Transportation
U.S. Route 41 runs along a portion of the township's eastern border, starting at the northeastern corner and going south for about  before veering to the east.  Indiana State Road 26 runs from the Illinois state line and across the northern part of the township, reaching U.S. Route 41 at the eastern border.  Indiana State Road 352 leaves State Road 26 at the western border and runs north for about  before leaving the township (and the county) on its way through the small town of Ambia in Benton County.  The township contains Dalton Airport.

Education
Most of Prairie township lies in the Benton Community School Corporation, and the southern portion of 
Prairie Township is part of the Metropolitan School District of Warren County.

Government
Prairie Township has a trustee who administers rural fire protection and ambulance service, provides relief to the poor, manages cemetery care, and performs farm assessment, among other duties. The trustee is assisted in these duties by a three-member township board. The trustees and board members are elected to four-year terms.

Prairie Township is part of Indiana's 8th congressional district, Indiana House of Representatives District 42, and Indiana State Senate District 38.

References

 
 United States Census Bureau TIGER/Line Shapefiles

Bibliography

External links

Townships in Warren County, Indiana
Populated places established in 1864
Townships in Indiana